Kamila Gradus (born 19 March 1967 in Warsaw, Mazowieckie) is a retired Polish marathon runner, who represented her native country at the 1996 Summer Olympics in Atlanta, Georgia.

Achievements
All results regarding marathon, unless stated otherwise

See also
Polish records in athletics

References

1967 births
Living people
Polish female long-distance runners
Athletes (track and field) at the 1996 Summer Olympics
Olympic athletes of Poland
Athletes from Warsaw
Legia Warsaw athletes
20th-century Polish women
21st-century Polish women